DF Music Organization (also known as «DF Empire», «DFMO», «DF Music Organization Inc»  and  «DF Music Organization Group») is an entertainment conglomerate located in North America, Latin America,  Europe, Middle East and South East Asia.

DFMO manages the audio branding and audio post-production company (DFAD), business management company (DF Group), trailer house, animation and art studio (DF Pictures) and B2B entertainment news agency (DFMO.NET).

History 

DF Music Organization was founded on September 10, 2004 by Dmitrii Miachin, Alexander Gavrilov and Leonid Morozov.  Starting from several businesses that were owned by DF, such as Record Label, Event Agency and DF Merchandise Store. 16 companies were built by DF in the period of 2004-2009.

DF's first international recognition came after collaboration in October 2004 with Moscow company TCI and music band Rammstein.

Attendance at DF events ranged from 300 to 2,000. In 2010 DF was taken to organization committee of the largest governments event in St. Petersburg, Russia. The event called "Red Sails" in Russian "Алые Паруса". The event take place at few historical places "Petropavlovskaya Krepost" and "Vasilivskiy Ostrov", rock band "Indonesia" performed with symphonic orchestra in front of the 300,000 people.

DF covered a lot of underground Rock and Electronic events in St. Petersburg that time, some of headliners were My Chemical Romance (USA), Rammstein (DE), Prodigy (UK), Dillinger Escape Plan (USA), Accept (DE), Amatory (RUS), Axwell (SWE), Armin Van Buuren (NL), Esthetic Education (UA), Apshell (RUS), Stigmata (RUS), IFK (RUS). Most of DF artists signed with DF Records in 2006 and DF Artist Management later the same year.

In, 2009 and 2010 DF Music Organization closed few main businesses due to world crisis and following crisis in entertainment media and physical distribution. Some of the artists, who were all the time with DF Records finished their music careers or joined other bands. The most talented DF musicians succeed internationally.

In 2011 direction of company changed, after first contract with Warner Bros, DF Music Organization expanded and began their business in USA and in later 2011 announced new business strategy called "best talents = best content",  establishing in Los Angeles and selling out all previous assets keeping the best talents and forming new companies like DFAD, DFAD's studios, DFAD's Library, DF Pictures and DF Group.

Companies

DFAD 

DFAD is an audio branding, audio post-production and audio production company, established in February 2012 in Beverly Hills, California. All DFAD’s works are based on the sound marketing research, science research, focus group tests, behavioral and audio communication psychology. DFAD produces and provides music, sound effects and voiceovers. Through the year have expand their business globally. DFAD's departments, such as "celebrity department" or "audio localization department" work with voiceover actors in 58 languages. Company implement original and emotive audio experiences using the latest technologies and extensive sonic knowledge and skills, covering all existing platforms, engines and middleware (Avid products, Dolby, Wwise, FMOD etc.).

For most of the time DFAD is hired as an external audio department by VR Projects / VR dev teams, Video Games / Game studios and dev teams, Feature Films / Film studios, TV Series / Networks, Trailers, Ads / Ad agencies and marketing campaigns.

Sound marketing and sonic researchers are main focus of DFAD. Top management of DFAD usually speak about this on the panels of different conferences.

Known for work with Chelsea Football club, Warner's TV series such as Arrow and Nikita, TV shows like Red Arrow's Mata Harri. Award winning Feature Films like Battle for Sevastopol or Video Games and Mobile Games such as Skyforge, Sparta, Hybrid Wars, WWR or Walking Robots, Nitro Nation, Dwarves Tale, Sacra Terra 2, The Saint. Abyss of Despair, House Of 1000 Doors, Illusionist, Mexicana, Esoterica, Super Market Mania 2, Legends of Ace, Legends of Eisenwald, Forest Legends, Forbidden Secrets, Deadly Voltage, Valves' and Running with Scissors' Postal 3, Snail Games' 5 Streets Playrix' Fishdom 3, Games Insight Dragons Eternity and Mirrors Of Albion, Gaijin's Adrenalin 2: Rush Hour etc. EA's Burnout, FIFA and Rockstar's GTA 4.

DFMO.NET 

DFMO.NET is a B2B entertainment news agency, headquartered in St. Petersburg, Russia.

Founded in 2006 as a 70-page rock magazine, today DFMO.NET generates and delivers entertainment news content to the mass-media all over the world.

DFMO.NET has been a media sponsor of different Russian and international shows, including Kiss, Lenny Kravitz, Uncafe, Tokio Hotel, In Flames, Linkin Park, Stone Sour, Evanescence, NIN, Dillinger Escape Plan, Slipknot, Korn, Rain, Maroon, Grave Worm, Opeth, Sensation White, Piratskaya Stantsiya, Boney Nem, Slot, Nikolay Voronov, Psikheya and others.

DFMO.NET made exclusive revealing interviews with Linkin Park, Devil Driver, Slipknot, Pleymo, Despised Icon, Horse The Band, In Flames, My Chemical Romance, t.A.T.u., Apshell, Stigmata, 5 Diez, Neversmile, Jane Air, Netherealm Studios.

DF Pictures 

Headquartered in Hollywood, California, DF Pictures is a Trailer House, Animation and Art studio specialized in creating sophisticated visual experiences for video games, tv and films, whether it is trailers or various art and design components. Our job is to take care of the specifics that establish a unified visual of the project, so that your vision can come to life with a detailed believability.

See also 
 DFMO.NET

References

External links 
 DFAD Audio Branding company's official web-site

Russian record labels